Jonah is a masculine given name derived from the , Yonā, meaning dove or pigeon. It is the name of the Abrahamic prophet Jonah.

People
 Jonah of Moscow (died 1461?),  Metropolitan of Kiev and All Rus'
 Jonah Anguka, Kenyan author
 Jonah Ayunga, Kenyan football player
 Jonah Barrington (journalist), English journalist
 Jonah Barrington (judge), Irish judge and politician
 Jonah Barrington (squash player), English squash player
 Jonah Bayliss, American baseball player
 Jonah Berger, American marketing professor
 Jonah Blechman, American actor
 Jonah Blank, American journalist 
 Jonah Bobo, American child actor
 Jonah Bokaer, American media artist
 Jonah Bolden, Australian basketball player
 Jonah Burt, Canadian judoka
 Jonah David Jang, Nigerian politician
 Jonah Edelman, American advocate for public education reform
 Jonah Falcon, American actor and writer
 Jonah Feingold, American writer of short films
 Jonah Frankel, Israeli writer
 Yonah Gerondi, Catalan rabbi and moralist
 Jonah Goldberg, American conservative political commentator
 Jonah Hill, American actor and writer
 Jonah Holmes, English rugby player
 Jonah Jackson (born 1997), American football player
 Jonah Jones, American jazz trumpeter
 Jonah Jones (sculptor), Welsh artist
 Jonah Keri, Canadian journalist
 Jonah Kim, South Korean cellist
 Jonah Koslen, American singer-songwriter 
 Jonah Kūhiō Kalanianaʻole, Prince of Hawai'i and American politician
 Jonah Kumalae, Hawaiian politician and ukulele manufacturer
 Jonah Lehrer, American science author and journalist
 Jonah Lomu, New Zealand rugby player
 Jonah Lowe, New Zealand rugby player
 Jonah Lotan, Israeli actor
 Jonah Matranga, American singer and songwriter
 Yona Melnik, Israeli judoka
 Jonah Meyerson, American actor
 Metropolitan Jonah Paffhausen, primate of the Orthodox Church in America
 Jonah Parzen-Johnson, American saxophonist
 Jonah Peretti, co-founder of Buzzfeed and The Huffington Post
 Jonah Piikoi, Hawaiian nobleman and politician
 Jonah Raskin, American writer
 Jonah Ray, American comedian
 Jonah Rockoff, American economist
 Jonah Sanford, American politician and Union Army colonel
 Jonah Sharp, American electronic music producer
 Jonah Sithole, Zimbabwean guitarist
 Jonah Williams (disambiguation), multiple people
 Jonah Wise, American rabbi

Fictional characters
 Jonah Beck, a main character on the Disney Channel series Andi Mack
 Jonah Hex, an American western comic book hero in DC Comics
 J. Jonah Jameson, in Spiderman comics and movies
 Jonah Takalua, a main character in the Australian comedy series Summer Heights High
 Jonah Wizard, a teenage movie star from the 39 Clues series
 Jonah Byrde, character in Netflix TV Show "Ozark"
 Jonah Simms, character in TV show "Superstore"

Male variants 
 Giona (Italian)
 Jonàs (Catalan)
 Jona (Croatian)
 Jonáš (Czech)
 Jonah (English)
 Jonas (German, Swedish, Latin, Lithuanian and Portuguese)
 Jónás (Hungarian)
 Jónas (Icelandic)
 Jonasz (Polish)
 Jonaš (Prekmurje dialect of Slovene)
 Jonáš (Slovak)
 Jona (Slovene)
 Jonás (Spanish)
 Yonah or Yona (יונה) (Hebrew and Yiddish)
 Yunus (Turkish)
 Younes (يونس) (Arabic)
 Joonas (Estonian and Finnish)
 Joona (Finnish)
 Yunsi (Berber)
 Ionas (Ίωνας) (Greek)
 Iunus
 Jona (Yoruba)
 Yunan (Syriac)

Masculine given names
English masculine given names